Line 18 of the Guangzhou Metro is a rapid transit express line in Guangzhou with trains operating up to . The line commenced service on 28 September 2021. Currently, there are train attendants on board each train. In the future, trains will operate fully driverless GoA4 mode when sufficient reliability from the signaling system has been confirmed.

Summary

Phase 1
This high speed can be sustained especially on the  section between Panyu Square and Hengli stations.

The service between Wanqingsha and Xiancun was opened on 28 September 2021. There are 2 distinct stopping patterns operating, facilitated by passing loops at select stations, a local all stop service and an express service stopping only at Hengli and Panyu Square. The local service will take only 37 minutes from Wanqingsha to XIancun, and the express service is even shortened by 7 minutes.

North extension
It will be fully underground. At Fangshi Station provisions have been made to allow for Line 18 trains to interline into Line 22 to directly serve Guangzhou Baiyun International Airport. A branch line via  allowing for through service to and from the Guangzhou-Qingyuan Intercity Railway is also under planning.

South extension
An extension is planned that would see the line extended to Zhongshan and Zhuhai. This extension is also known as "Nansha to Zhuhai (Zhongshan) intercity"  or "Nanzhongzhu intercity". Construction on the extension is expected to start before the end of 2021. 

Since November 2020, the Zhuhai Municipal government is also studying extending Line 18 to connect with the Hong Kong–Zhuhai–Macau Bridge at the Zhuhai-Macao Port artificial island. Additionally, a connection line has been proposed south of Wanqingsha Station, to allow Line 18 to through operate into the Shenzhen–Dayawan intercity railway.

Planning 
Line 18 and Line 22 were originally planned as long-term projects, but the desire to promote development of the Nansha Free Trade Zone fast tracked the project for construction. Line 18 will be designed as an express line to provide a rapid transit link between Nansha District and the central urban area of Guangzhou. The planned travel time between Nansha Free Trade Zone and central Guangzhou is proposed to be 30 minutes.

The government received a number of requests from the public to increase the number of stations along the line. In particular a station at  allowing from interchange with Line 1 and a station at Yuwotou Town. The planners rejected the suggestions to maintain the line's wide stop spacing to allow for the target of 30 minute travel time Nansha and central Guangzhou. Together with the planned Line 26 along Guangzhou Avenue, Line 18 is expected to provide some relief to Line 3.

Opening time

Stations
Legend
 - Opened on 28 September 2021
 - Under construction

Rolling Stock 
The trains are manufactured by CRRC Zhuzhou Locomotive with the first train was officially delivered on September 25, 2020. Initially upon opening, 15 trains were put into operation. Line 18 is the first line of Guangzhou Metro to introduce different thermostat settings in each car and set up first class cars. In the future, differentiated charges will be implemented to meet the needs of different passengers.

References

18
Railway lines opened in 2021
25 kV AC railway electrification